Diário do Povo (Portuguese for People's Diary) is a newspaper published in the city of Campinas, state of São Paulo, Brazil. 

Correio Popular is owned and managed by a larger communications holding company, Rede Anhangüera de Comunicação, which operates a news agency (AAN), a printing facility (Grafcorp), a polls company (Datacorp) and owns also several other newspapers in Campinas, Piracicaba and Ribeirão Preto, such as Correio Popular (the largest newspaper in Campinas, with a 65% market share), Gazeta do Cambuí, Gazeta de Piracicaba, Gazeta de Ribeirão and the Metrópole magazine, which circulates on Sundays with Correio Popular.

Diário do Povo, as the other RAC's newspapers are available on-line though a Web portal called Cosmo.

External links
 Diário do Povo Website
 Rede Anhangüera de Comunicação Website
 Cosmo Web Portal

Newspapers published in Brazil
Portuguese-language newspapers
Mass media in Campinas
Newspapers established in 1912
1912 establishments in Brazil